Ganeshipur Uperhar is a small locality in Saidabad Block of Handia region situated in Allahabad district, Uttar Pradesh, India.The native language of Ganeshipur Uperhar is Hindi and Urdu.This village consist of two primary school one PHC and Panchayat Bhavan.The current village head is Mr. Suresh Jaishwal And B.D.C. Mr. Vinod Tiwari.Ex.Village head was Rajbali Yadav And B.D.C. Shri Tribhuwannath Tiwari

Geography 
Ganeshipur Uperhar is located at 25°20'5"N 82°5'54"E.
It has an average elevation of 92 metres (301 feet). It is the village                      
comes near on the way of NH-2 also popularly known as G.T. Road 
(Grand Trunk Road) National highways of India 
Ganga or Ganges is the only main river in this area.
It consists of a canal nearbuy its cultivated land ,naming bairagiya naala
and small ponds near by this village. It has a very big area of cultivated land naming kachhar.

Demographics 
Ganeshipur Uperhar had a population of 12000. Males constitute 52% of the population and females 48%. The average literacy rate is 65%, greater than the national average of 59.5%: male literacy is 63%, and female literacy is 39%. In Ganeshipur Brahmin Basti,20.5% of the population is under 6 years of age. Out of these populations, 98% live in rural areas and the rest of them reside in urban areas. There are nearly 800 households.

Transportation 

The nearest railway station to Ganeshipur Uperhar (Brahmin Basti) is Saidabad and Handia Khas, which is located in and around 6.0 and 14.0 kilometer distance.Other stations and their distances from Mamakudi: Handia Khas railway station, 14.0 km. Meja Road railway station,16.1 km. Bheerpur railway station, 17.6 km. Birpur railway station, 13.6 km. Unchdih railway station, 15.2 km. The nearest airport to Ganeshipur Uperhar (Brahmin Basti) is Allahabad Airport, situated at 40.1 km distance. A few more airports around Ganeshipur Uperhar are as follows: Lal Bahadur Shastri Airport, 76.5 km. Sultanpur Airport, 103.4 km.

References

Villages in Allahabad district